Uracane is an island in the Bissagos Islands of Guinea-Bissau. The island has a population of 1,181 (2009 census). It is part of the sector of Uno within the Bolama Region. It lies northeast of Uno, and south of Formosa.

References 

Bolama Region
Bissagos Islands